Mykhailo Serhiyovych Hrechukha (19 September 1902 - 15 May 1976) was a Ukrainian and Soviet politician, who served as the chairman of Presidium of the Supreme Council of the Ukrainian Soviet Socialist Republic from 1939 to 1954. He was elected to the 1st through 5th convocations of Verkhovna Rada of the Ukrainian SSR.

Biography
Mykhailo Hrechukha was born in a village of Moshny that today is located in Cherkasy Raion, central Ukraine.

See also
 List of mayors of Zhytomyr

References

External links
Profile in the Handbook on history of the Communist Party and the Soviet Union 1898–1991
Mykhailo Hrechukha in the Jurist Encyclopedia of Ukraine

1902 births
1976 deaths
People from Cherkasy Oblast
People from Kiev Governorate
Ukrainian people in the Russian Empire
Communist Party of Ukraine (Soviet Union) politicians
Central Committee of the Communist Party of the Soviet Union candidate members
Politburo of the Central Committee of the Communist Party of Ukraine (Soviet Union) members
First convocation members of the Soviet of the Union
Second convocation members of the Soviet of the Union
Third convocation members of the Soviet of the Union
Fourth convocation members of the Soviet of the Union
Fifth convocation members of the Soviet of the Union
First convocation members of the Verkhovna Rada of the Ukrainian Soviet Socialist Republic
Second convocation members of the Verkhovna Rada of the Ukrainian Soviet Socialist Republic
Third convocation members of the Verkhovna Rada of the Ukrainian Soviet Socialist Republic
Fourth convocation members of the Verkhovna Rada of the Ukrainian Soviet Socialist Republic
Fifth convocation members of the Verkhovna Rada of the Ukrainian Soviet Socialist Republic
Head of Presidium of the Verkhovna Rada of the Ukrainian Soviet Socialist Republic
Recipients of the Order of Bogdan Khmelnitsky (Soviet Union), 1st class
Recipients of the Order of Lenin
Recipients of the Order of the Red Banner of Labour
First vice prime ministers of Ukraine
Soviet leaders of Ukraine
Burials at Baikove Cemetery